Route 343, also known as Road to Comfort Cove, is a short north–south highway that leads from Route 340 (Road to the Isles) just east of Campbellton to Comfort Cove-Newstead on the northern coast of the island of Newfoundland in the Canadian province of Newfoundland and Labrador. It is a relatively short highway with no other towns on the route other than Comfort Cove-Newstead. As with most highways in Newfoundland and Labrador, it is entirely a two-lane highway.

Major intersections

See also 
List of Newfoundland and Labrador highways

References

343